Vitina is a town and municipality in eastern Kosovo.

Vitina may also refer to:
 Vitina (Ljubuški), a village in the municipality of Ljubuški, West Herzegovina Canton, Bosnia and Herzegovina 
 , a village in the municipality of Rudozem, Smolyan Province, Bulgaria
 Vitina, an alternative spelling of Vytina, Greece